The Korg DW-6000 is a six voice polyphonic analog synthesizer with two single-cycle digitally controlled waveform oscillators and one voltage controlled lowpass filter per voice.  As basic material, eight wave cycle waveforms were available to the user through a system Korg called DWGS for Digital controlled Waveform Generator System.  The single cycle waveforms are stored on two 256 Kilobit ROM chips, played back through the two digital oscillators and processed by relatively familiar subtractive synthesis facilities.  

Patch editing is performed by the typical (for the time) method of selecting a parameter then using a single data entry slider to increment or decrement the value.  Curiously, the factory patch names are written on the front panel, a trait more apt to be found on consumer keyboards rather than professional synthesizers.  Another trait that belies the DW-6000's "budget" role, relative to its more capable and expensive fellow Korg unit Korg DW-8000, is the lack of velocity sensitivity or aftertouch capabilities.

See also
 Korg Poly-61
 Korg DW-8000

References

External links
 Vintage Synth Explorer
 Synthesizer Database

D
Analog/digital hybrid synthesizers
Polyphonic synthesizers